Torodora flavescens is a moth in the family Lecithoceridae. It was described by László Anthony Gozmány in 1978. It is found in southern China and Thailand.

The wingspan is 14–15 mm.

References

Moths described in 1978
Torodora